Metchley Fort was a Roman fort in what is now Birmingham, England. It was built across four phases using a north-to-south plan.

History

Roman era 
It lies on the course of a Roman road, Icknield Street, which is now the site of the present Queen Elizabeth Hospital and the University of Birmingham in Edgbaston. The fort was constructed on the orders of Publius Ostorius Scapula soon after the Roman invasion of Britain, roughly in AD 48. Within the fort were timber buildings including barrack blocks, a granary, a workshop and a store. In AD 60 or 61, Metchley Fort may have been involved in the Boudican Revolt, and in AD 70, the fort was abandoned, only to be reoccupied around AD 90, when another fort, half the size of the original, was built on the same site, before being abandoned again in AD 120.

Remains have also been found of a civilian settlement, or vicus alongside the fort. It consisted of timber buildings and yards alongside a road leading from the fort's west gate, and was occupied for just a few years, when the fort was at its largest.

The fort was extended on three sides by the addition of defended annexes, which were used for tethering horses, storage and small-scale industrial activity such as ironworking. Later, the fort's buildings were replaced by other structures including compounds which suggest that it was now being used as a stores depot.

Post-medieval era (16th century  ) 
A hunting lodge was present on the site of Metchley Fort as early as the 16th century, likely near the retentura and latera praetorii. It was eventually demolished around 1781 when the earthworks of the fort were first identified.

Discovery and excavations (  present) 
The remains were first identified around 1781 by William Hutton (he published his findings on Metchley Fort in his History of Birmingham), although there were conflicting opinions on the origins of the earthworks - the common consensus at the time agreed that the fort was Norse in origin. The fort was confirmed to date to the 1st and 2nd century AD in excavations that took place in the 1930s, starting in 1934, when the University of Birmingham Medical School was constructed. Further excavations took place in the 1940s and 1950s. On 28 September 1953 the Lord Mayor of Birmingham, G. H. W. Griffith, opened the newly restored north-west corner of the fort. The reconstruction of the corner did not last long, however, as it was later destroyed by vandals before 1956. More extensive excavations took place in the 1960s which uncovered various timber buildings within the fort. Mick Aston, who later became well-known on the TV programme Time Team, worked on the Metchley excavations in the late 1960s.  Discoveries from excavations in the early 2000s included ovens and hearths, timber gateways, roads, the headquarters building, vessels from the Severn Valley and the Malvern Hills, and tableware from France.

The remains of the fort are one of thirteen scheduled monuments in Birmingham.

Gallery

References

Buildings and structures in Birmingham, West Midlands
Metchley
Scheduled monuments in the West Midlands (county)
Former populated places in the West Midlands (county)
Edgbaston
Demolished buildings and structures in the West Midlands (county)